The Rumbach Street synagogue is located in Belváros, the inner city of the historical old town of Pest, in the eastern section of Budapest.
The synagogue in Rumbach Street was built in 1872 to the design of the Viennese architect Otto Wagner. Intentionally meant to serve the members of the Neológ community of Pest, its construction coincided with the Schism in Hungarian Jewry of 1869, and it became the home of the more conservative Status Quo faction.

The Moorish Revival synagogue has eight sides and has recently been restored with a grant from the Budapest Government.  The octagonal, balconied, domed synagogue intricately patterned and painted in Islamic style is exquisitely beautiful. It was built not as an exact replica of, but as an homage to the style of the octagonal, domed Dome of the Rock shrine in Jerusalem.

Historically, but especially since the completion of its renovation in the summer of 2021, the synagogue regularly hosts plays, concerts, photo exhibits and other cultural events.

The Rabbi of the Rumbach Street synagogue was Rabbi Shloime Boruch Schmalhausen until the Holocaust and deportation of the Jews of Budapest.

History

A modern, revamped and restored building was inaugurated in June, 2021. The restoration costs included a USD11.2m grant from the Hungarian state.

Notes

References

 
 
 
 
Jewish.hu - The Synagogue Triangle
 Kaufman, Rachelle Kaufman An American Jew in Budapest 2015

External links

Status Quo (Rumbach St.) Synagogue in the Bezalel Narkiss Index of Jewish Art, Center for Jewish Art, Hebrew University of Jerusalem

See also
 * Status Quo Ante Synagogue

Synagogues completed in 1872
Moorish Revival synagogues
Round and octagonal synagogues
Synagogues in Budapest
Buildings designed to replicate Solomon's Temple
Art Nouveau synagogues
Art Nouveau architecture in Budapest
Otto Wagner buildings
Synagogue buildings with domes
Neolog Judaism synagogues